Sclerophora pallida is an epiphytic lichen with stipitated acomata. In Europe, it is mostly found on broadleaf deciduous trees (e.g. Fraxinus excelsior, Ulmus spp., Acer platanoides). It is rare on young trees and is mostly common only on trees older than 70 years. Because of that, the species is considered to be close to being threatened by extinction in Norway.

References

Ascomycota
Lichen species
Taxa named by Christiaan Hendrik Persoon
Lichens described in 1794
Fungi of Europe